Lú is the pinyin romanization of the Chinese surname written  in simplified character and  in traditional character. It is also spelled Lo or Loh according to the Cantonese pronunciation. Lu 卢 is the 52nd most common surname in China, shared by 5.6 million people, or 0.475% of the Chinese population as of 2002. It is especially common in Guangdong, Guangxi, Hainan, and Hebei provinces.  Lu 卢 is listed 167th in the Song dynasty classic text Hundred Family Surnames.

In 2019 it was the 50th most common surname in Mainland China.

Origins
According to the Tang dynasty genealogy text Yuanhe Xing Zuan, the surname Lu 卢 originated in the State of Qi during the Spring and Autumn period, and descended from Gao Xi (高傒). Gao Xi was the grandson of Prince Gao, who was a son of Duke Wen of Qi (reigned 815–804 BC) and a descendant of Lü Shang, the founder of Qi. When the Qi ruler Wuzhi was murdered in 685 BC, Gao Xi, then prime minister of Qi, helped to install Prince Xiaobai on the throne, to be known as Duke Huan of Qi, one of the Five Hegemons of the Spring and Autumn period. In gratitude, Duke Huan enfeoffed Gao Xi at the city of Lu 卢 (in modern Changqing District, Shandong province), and many of Gao's descendants adopted Lu 卢 as their surname. This is the main origin of the surname, and Gao Xi is regarded as the founding ancestor of the Lu 卢 surname.

According to the Song dynasty encyclopedia Tongzhi, there was a second source of the Lu 卢 surname from the State of Qi. A branch of Duke Huan of Qi's descendants had the surname Lupu (卢蒲), which was later shortened to Lu.

A separate source of Lu was the minor state of Luzi 庐子 or Lu 庐 (in modern Anhui province) during the Spring and Autumn period. The descendants of Jili (戢黎), a nobleman of Lu, adopted the name of their state as their surname. Lu 庐 was later simplified to Lu 卢.

Distribution
Of the top 30 cities in China, 卢 ranked 9th most common in the city of Nanning.

Later adoption
During the Xianbei Northern Wei dynasty, Emperor Xiaowen (reigned 467–499 AD) implemented a drastic policy of sinicization, ordering his own people to adopt Chinese surnames. The Tufulu (吐伏卢) and Molu (莫卢) clans of Xianbei adopted Lu as their surname. The Xianbei people have since completely assimilated into the Han Chinese.

According to the Book of Sui, Zhangchou Taiyi (章仇太翼), a native of Hejian Commandery (in modern Cangzhou, Hebei) was a famous scholar of the time. Emperor Yang of Sui granted him the surname Lu 卢. Zhangchou subsequently became known as Lu Taiyi, and was the ancestor of the prosperous Hejian Lu clan.

Lu clan of Fanyang

In the fourth century BC, the throne of the Qi state was usurped by the Tian clan. Many aristocratic clans that descended from the old ruling house of Jiang (姜), including Lu, fled the state and dispersed all over China. During the Qin dynasty, the erudite Lu Ao (盧敖) settled in Fanyang Commandery (modern Beijing). The Fanyang Lu clan later became exceedingly prosperous. During the Jin dynasty (266–420), the Fanyang Lu, together with the Cui clan of Boling, the Wang clan of Taiyuan, the Zheng clan of Xingyang, and the Li clan of Zhao, were considered the five most prominent clans in China (海内五大望族). During the Tang dynasty, eight chancellors were surnamed Lu 盧, including several from Fanyang.

During the Tang dynasty the Li clan of Zhao 赵郡李氏, the Cui clan of Boling, the Cui clan of Qinghe, the Lu clan of Fanyang, the Zheng clan of Xingyang 荥阳郑氏, the Wang clan of Taiyuan 太原王氏, and the Li clan of Longxi 隴西李氏 were the seven noble clans between whom marriage was banned by law. Their status as "Seven Great surnames" became known during Gaozong's rule.

Notable people
 Lu Wan (盧綰; 256–194 BC), Western Han dynasty general
 Lu Zhi (盧植; died 192 AD), Eastern Han dynasty politician
 Lu Sidao (盧思道; 531–582), Sui dynasty poet
 Lu Chengqing (盧承慶; 595–670), Tang dynasty chancellor
 Lu Zhaolin (盧照鄰; ca. 634 – ca. 686) Tang dynasty poet
 Lu Huaishen (盧懷慎; died 716), Tang dynasty chancellor
 Lu Qi (盧杞; died 785), Tang dynasty chancellor
 Lu Lun (盧綸; 739-799), Tang dynasty poet
 Lu Han (盧翰; fl. 8th century), Tang dynasty chancellor
 Lu Tong (盧仝; died 835), Tang dynasty poet
 Lu Shang (盧商; 789–859), Tang dynasty chancellor
 Lu Xi (盧攜; died 881), Tang dynasty chancellor
 Lu Zhi (盧摯; 1243–1315), Yuan dynasty poet
 Lu Xiangsheng (盧象昇; 1600-1639), Ming dynasty general of Tianxiong Army
 Lu Kun (盧坤; 1772–1835), Qing dynasty viceroy of Huguang and Liangguang
 Lu Muzhen (盧慕貞; 1867–1952), Sun Yat-sen's first wife
 Lu Yongxiang (盧永祥; 1867–1933), warlord
 C. T. Loo (盧芹齋, Lu Qinzhai; 1880–1957), art dealer
 Lu Han (盧漢; 1895–1974), Kuomintang general
 Lu Jiaxi (chemist) (卢嘉锡; 1915–2001), chemist, President of the Chinese Academy of Sciences
 Lisa Lu (盧燕; Lu Yan; born 1927), actress
 Lu Yen (盧炎; Lu Yan; 1930–2008), Taiwanese composer
 Lu Yonggen ( 卢永根; 1930–2019), plant geneticist, President of South China Agricultural University
 Lu Ruihua (卢瑞华; born 1938), former Governor of Guangdong province
 Lo Hoi-pang (盧海鵬; Lu Haipeng; born 1941), Hong Kong actor
 Lu Hsiu-yi (盧修一; Liu Xiuyi; 1941–1998), Taiwanese politician
 Lowell Lo (盧冠廷; Lu Guanting; born 1950), Hong Kong musician
 Anna Lo (盧曼華; Lo Manwah; born 1950), Hong Kong-born Northern Ireland politician
 Lu Zhangong (卢展工; born 1952), party chief of Fujian and Henan provinces
 Ken Lo (盧惠光; Lu Huiguang; born 1959), Hong Kong actor and martial artist
 Money Lo (盧敏儀, born 1960), a Hong Kong actress
 Ed Lu (盧傑; Lu Jie; born 1963), Chinese-American physicist, NASA astronaut of the International Space Station
 Lu Shaye (卢沙野; born 1964), diplomat
 Chris Lu (盧沛寧; Lu Peining; born 1966), Chinese-American politician
 Candy Lo (盧巧音; Lu Qiaoyin; born 1974), Hong Kong singer and actress
 Monica Lo (卢淑仪; Lu Shuyi; born 1978), Hong Kong-based Canadian actress and model
 Lu Rui En (卢瑞恩; born 1981), Singaporean actress and singer
 Lu Yen-Hsun (盧彥勳; Lu Yanxun; born 1983), Taiwanese tennis player
 Lo Kwan Yee (盧均宜; Lu Junyi; born 1984), Hong Kong football player
 Lo Chun Kit (盧俊傑; Lu Junjie; born 1985), Hong Kong football player
 Lu Ying-chi (盧映錡; born 1985), Taiwanese weightlifter
 Crowd Lu (盧廣仲; Lu Guangzhong; born 1985), Taiwanese singer-songwriter
 Lu Lin (卢琳; born 1985), football player
 Ellen Joyce Loo (盧凱彤; Lu Kaitong; born 1986), Hong Kong-based Canadian singer-songwriter
 Lu Lan (卢兰; born 1987), badminton player
 Lu Junyi (盧俊義), fictional character in the novel Water Margin
 Anson Lo (盧瀚霆; born 1995), Hong Kong singer, dancer and actor

Notable Korean people with the 盧 surname
 Lho Shin-yong (盧信永; born 1930), 18th Prime Minister of South Korea
 Roh Tae-woo (盧泰愚; born 1932), South Korean president
 Ro Jai-bong (盧在鳳; born 1936), 22nd Prime Minister of South Korea
 Roh Moo-hyun (盧武鉉; born 1946), South Korean president

References

Chinese-language surnames
Individual Chinese surnames